Pasinler may refer to:
Pasinler District, an administrative district of Erzurum Province, Turkey
Pasinler (town), a town 40 km east of the city of Erzurum, Turkey
Pasinler Plain, a plain in eastern Turkey, part of the Pasinler Basin